New Barag Right Banner (Mongolian:     Sin-e Barɣu Baraɣun qosiɣu), also romanized as Xin Barag Youqi, is a banner of northern Inner Mongolia, People's Republic of China, bordering Mongolia in all directions but the east. It is also located not too far from the shores of Hulun Lake, and is under the administration of Hulunbuir City.

The banner is served by Xinbarag Youqi Baogede Airport, opened in December 2017.

Climate

References

www.xzqh.org 

Banners of Inner Mongolia
Hulunbuir